A contractor is a person or company that performs work on a contract basis. The term may refer to:

Business roles 
 Defense contractor, arms industry which provides weapons or military goods to a government
 General contractor, an individual or organization responsible for the construction of a building or other facility
 Government contractor, a private company which produces goods or services for the government
 Independent contractor, a natural person, business or corporation which provides goods or services to another entity under terms specified in a contract
 Private military company, an organization or individual that contracts to provide services of a military nature
 School bus contractor, a private company or proprietorship which provides school bus service to a school district or non-public school
 Subcontractor, an individual or business that signs a contract to perform part or all of the obligations of another's contract
 Permatemp, a person who works for an organization for an extended period via a staffing agency
 Someone engaged in contract killing

Films 
The Contractor (2007 film), an action film starring Wesley Snipes
The Contractor (2013 film), a crime drama thriller film starring Danny Trejo
The Contractor (2022 film), an action film starring Chris Pine

Other uses 
Contractor (1779 EIC ship), an East Indiaman launched in 1779
Contractor (surname), a list of people with the surname
 Interval contractor, a mathematical operator

See also
 Contract (disambiguation)